Ivers is the Name of the following people:

Donald L. Ivers (born 1941), former judge of the United States Court of Appeals for Veterans Claims
Eileen Ivers (born 1965), Irish-US-American musician
Julia Crawford Ivers (1869 - 1930), US-American motion picture pioneer
Peter Ivers (1946 - 1983), US-American musician
Rebecca Ivers, Australian injury prevention researcher
Robert Ivers (1934 - 2003), US-American actor

See also
 The Strange Love of Martha Ivers
 Ivers Whitney Adams